Clatworthy is a village and civil parish in the Somerset West and Taunton district of Somerset, England.

The Clatworthy Reservoir is run by Wessex Water and has a capacity of 5,364,000 cubic metres, supplying some 200,000 homes. It impounds the head waters of the River Tone and the surrounding area is used for walking and fishing.

History

The name of the village means the "homestead where burdock grows". The name appears in the Doomesday Book, 1086, and is the Norman version of the original Anglo Saxon name which was Clota's Wertig [farm]. The Normans changed the name to clateurde which became clatworthy and in some instances Clotworthy.

The parish of Clatworthy was part of the Williton and Freemanners Hundred.

Just west of the village, at the edge of Exmoor National Park, is the Clatworthy Reservoir, which impounds the headwaters of River Tone and supplies water to some 200,000 homes and businesses, some as far away as Yeovil. An Iron Age enclosure known as Clatworthy Castle was sited on the wooded slopes above the reservoir and there are round barrows in the north of the parish.

Governance

The parish council has responsibility for local issues, including setting an annual precept (local rate) to cover the council's operating costs and producing annual accounts for public scrutiny. The parish council evaluates local planning applications and works with the local police, district council officers, and neighbourhood watch groups on matters of crime, security, and traffic. The parish council's role also includes initiating projects for the maintenance and repair of parish facilities, as well as consulting with the district council on the maintenance, repair, and improvement of highways, drainage, footpaths, public transport, and street cleaning. Conservation matters (including trees and listed buildings) and environmental issues are also the responsibility of the council.

The village falls within the non-metropolitan district of Somerset West and Taunton, which was established on 1 April 2019. It was previously in the district of West Somerset, which was formed on 1 April 1974 under the Local Government Act 1972, and part of Williton Rural District before that. The district council is responsible for local planning and building control, local roads, council housing, environmental health, markets and fairs, refuse collection and recycling, cemeteries and crematoria, leisure services, parks, and tourism.

Somerset County Council is responsible for running the largest and most expensive local services such as education, social services, libraries, main roads, public transport, policing and fire services, trading standards, waste disposal and strategic planning.

It is also part of the Bridgwater and West Somerset represented in the House of Commons of the Parliament of the United Kingdom. It elects one Member of Parliament (MP) by the first past the post system of election, and was part of the South West England constituency of the European Parliament prior to Britain leaving the European Union in January 2020, which elected seven MEPs using the d'Hondt method of party-list proportional representation.

Religious sites

The parish Church of St Mary Magdalene has a 12th-century tower. The nave was rebuilt in 1872, while the chancel was rebuilt and the tower altered between 1860 and 1883.

References

External links

Villages in West Somerset
Civil parishes in Somerset